Michael Colin Longmore (born 19 September 1979) is an English cricketer.  Longmore is a right-handed batsman.  He was born in Stoke-on-Trent, Staffordshire.

Longmore made his debut for Staffordshire in the 1999 Minor Counties Championship against Cambridgeshire.  Longmore played Minor counties cricket for Staffordshire from 1999 to 2005, which included 17 Minor Counties Championship matches and a single MCCA Knockout Trophy match.  In 2001, he made his List A debut against Hertfordshire in the 1st round of the Cheltenham & Gloucester Trophy.  His second appearance came against Northumberland in the 2nd round of the same competition, with both rounds being played in 2001.  He played a further List A match against Warwickshire in the 3rd round of the same competition which was played in 2002.  In his 3 List A matches, he scored 63 runs at an average of 21.00, with a high score of 41.

References

External links
Michael Longmore at ESPNcricinfo
Michael Longmore at CricketArchive

1979 births
Living people
Cricketers from Stoke-on-Trent
English cricketers
Staffordshire cricketers